Holy Trinity Academy may refer to:

 Holy Trinity Academy (Drayton Valley), Drayton Valley, Canada
 Holy Trinity Academy (Okotoks), Okotoks, Canada
 Holy Trinity Academy (Philippines), Manila, Philippines
 Holy Trinity Academy, Telford, England

See also
 Holy Trinity (disambiguation)
 Holy Trinity College (disambiguation)
 Holy Trinity School (disambiguation)